The 1924 Stanley Cup playoffs was the third and final year in which the National Hockey League (NHL) champions, the Pacific Coast Hockey Association (PCHA) champions, and the Western Canada Hockey League (WCHL) champions all competed for the Stanley Cup (the PCHA and the WCHL would later merge after the season). The playoffs began on March 18, 1924, and concluded on March 25 when the NHL champion Montreal Canadiens defeated the WCHL champion Calgary Tigers in the final series, two games to zero.

Background
Montreal finished second overall in the 1923–24 NHL regular season standings with a 13–11 record, behind the 16–8 Ottawa Senators. However, the Canadiens upset the Senators in the two-game total goal league champion series, 5 goals to 2, to win the NHL title.

Calgary finished the 1923–24 WCHL regular season with an 18–11–1 record. The Tigers then defeated the 17–11–2 second place Regina Capitals in the WCHL championship series, tying Game 1 in Regina, 2–2, and then winning 2–0 in Calgary.

The 1923–24 PCHA season was capped with the 13–6–1 Vancouver Maroons defeating the 14–16–1 Seattle Metropolitans in a two-game league championship series.

Pre-Cup playoffs news
Both rounds of the Stanley Cup playoffs were scheduled to be played on the NHL winner's home ice, with Montreal having to face both the PCHA and the WCHL champions. However, Canadiens owner Leo Dandurand claimed that Calgary and Vancouver were inferior to his. He therefore wanted the two western teams to face off against each other, and then have the Canadiens play the winner in the final round. PCHA President Frank Patrick refused to go along with that idea and instead proposed a compromise in which the host team's (Montreal's) customary contribution towards the two other clubs' travel expenses would be cut in half.

But in order to generate the additional money, Calgary and Vancouver decided to play a three-game series before going to Montreal, with the loser having to face the Canadiens in the first round of the Stanley Cup playoffs. Games were played in Vancouver, Calgary, and Winnipeg, with the Tigers coming back from a Game 1 loss to win the next two contests.

Despite this extra series between the Tigers and the Maroons, Montreal still had to defeat both western teams in order to win the Cup.

Stanley Cup Semifinals
The Canadiens swept the Maroons in two, one-goal victories in the best-of-three series. Billy Boucher scored the game-winning goal in Montreal's 3–2 victory in the Game 1. In Game 2, Vancouver scored first on a goal by Billy's brother, Frank Boucher. But Billy scored two goals of his own to give the Canadiens a 2–1 win and clinch the series.

Stanley Cup Finals

Montreal also swept Calgary in the best-of-three series to clinch the Cup. In the first game, rookie Howie Morenz recorded a hat-trick as he led the Canadiens to a 6–1 victory. The second game was then moved to the artificial ice at Ottawa Auditorium in Ottawa because of poor ice conditions at Mount Royal Arena. There, goaltender Georges Vézina lead Montreal to a 3–0 shutout to clinch the Cup. Morenz also added another goal in the second contest, but was also leveled by Calgary right wing Cully Wilson and suffered a chipped collarbone. The Canadiens won their first Stanley Cup as a member of the NHL, their second counting the 1916 Cup win.

Cup engravings
After the playoffs, a new ring was added to the Cup with the player's names engraved along with the following: "Canadiens of Montreal / World's Champions / Defeated / Ottawa Vancouver Calgary / Two Straight Games Each"

See also
1923–24 NHL season
1923–24 WCHL season

References

playoffs
Stanley Cup playoffs